The ruins of the Üçayak Byzantine Church ("Three-legged Church") are found in Kırşehir Province in Central Anatolia, Turkey. The church is unique in several respects. It is built on a remote location, without any evidence of any artefacts in the surrounding area, apparently in a completely isolated place, with no signs of human habitation.

Its architectural design has been described as executed on an "exceptionally high artistic level". Other unusual features include a double or twin-church design, an all-brick construction with the exception of its foundations, and sloping walls. It has been dated to around the late 10th to 11th centuries. The style of the church is double-nave basilica.

It is located in the southern part of Kırşehir Province, near the village of Taburoğlu, which is approximately six kilometres from the Yerköy-Yozgat highway.

History 

The Byzantine name of the location of the church is unknown. Proposed names include Justinianopolis, Pteria, and Mokissos. It is widely speculated to have been dedicated to Emperors Basil II (976–1025) and Constantine VIII (976–1028). Near the church, there is a water spring, but the absence of any human artefacts in the vicinity indicates that the church was built on a completely isolated and uninhabited area.

The remnants of the decorations of the facades, its sloping walls, and its architectural style led to its chronology being placed to late 10th or 11th centuries AD. On the Yerköy road in the north of Kırşehir, an inscription gave the name of St. Lukianos. The first report on the church was in 1842 by W. F. Ainsworth. His travel notes on the church were used by John Winter Crowfoot who visited the ruins in 1900, and were eventually published by Josef Strzygowski in 1903. The 1938 Kırşehir earthquake caused the dome arches of the church to collapse.

Architecture 

The construction of the church, solely using bricks as the medium, is very unusual in Byzantine architecture. The church foundation was made of stone. In 1900, John Winter Crowfoot reports a pinkish external layer covering the brick walls. In-between the walls, base material, consisting of rubble, stones and other fillers, was used. The filler material was supported by a wooden-beam structure.

Double naves, apses and domes

The church design is very unusual for Byzantine architecture. The church is constructed as a double-church featuring two naves adjacent to each other and separated by a wall. The naves were quadrangular and each featured a separate dome. The naves have a common narthex of an oblong shape. The twin church design at Üçayak has two naves (naoi) each with a separate semi-circular apse. Each apse includes a rectangular bay in front of it.

The double-church design is even more unusual because the two churches were constructed at the same time, as opposed to being built sequentially, which was the construction method employed more often for churches of this type. Scholars speculate that the double church was constructed either in honour of two distinct saints or martyrs, or because a Byzantine emperor and his wife built it; the latter explanation being more probable, since no crypts or other artefacts, attesting to the worship of saints or martyrs, have been found.

Niches
The exterior walls are decorated by arches that recess into the walls forming niches. The same technique had been used for the church of Çanlı Kilise in Cappadocia and the Church of the Dormition of the Mother of God in Nicaea (modern-day Iznik). The recessed arches and the all-brick wall construction of the Üçayak church provided an impressive architectural element to its design.

Decorations
In 1900, John Winter Crowfoot reports faint traces of a fresco decorating a pendentive. Even at that time, it was difficult to discern any details of the theme of the fresco other than what appeared to be a series of heads with haloes. Crowfoot also reports that there were traces of two illegible inscriptions when he visited the site in 1900. The inscription may have contained clues as to the reason for building the church at such a completely isolated area.

Restoration
The church is a rare example of early Byzantine period architecture in Kırşehir Province, which is considered to be located within the area occupied by ancient Cappadocia, or at the border of the Byzantine provinces of Galatia and Cappadocia. Ahi Evran University is planning restoration and conservation of the ruins.

References

11th-century Eastern Orthodox church buildings
Buildings and structures in Kırşehir Province
Byzantine churches in Cappadocia
Double churches
Ruined churches in Turkey